The Old South Union Church is a congregational church in Weymouth, Massachusetts. The white clapboarded church is a replica of an 1853–54 building that was destroyed by fire in 1989. The building has a strong Greek Revival, with paneled pilasters on the front facade, but also has Italianate bracketed eaves and dentillated cornice and pediment. The church building was listed the National Register of Historic Places in 1982. The congregation was established in 1721, and is now affiliated with the United Church of Christ. The current senior pastor is the Reverend Jennifer Barrett Siegal.

See also
 National Register of Historic Places listings in Norfolk County, Massachusetts

References

External links
 Old South Union Church Official Website

United Church of Christ churches in Massachusetts
Churches on the National Register of Historic Places in Massachusetts
Churches in Norfolk County, Massachusetts
Buildings and structures in Weymouth, Massachusetts
National Register of Historic Places in Norfolk County, Massachusetts